The Lords of Altamont are a rock and roll band from Los Angeles, California.  The band mixes the sounds of '60s garage and psychedelic rock, American punk rock, British rhythm and blues and glam combined with B-movie biker exploitation imagery. Past and present line-ups of The Lords of Altamont have included members of The Bomboras,  The Fuzztones, The MC5 and The Cramps. As of 2017 the band has released six albums on various labels including the newest, The Wild Sounds of the Lords of Altamont, on Heavy Psych Sounds Records.

Background 
The current lineup consists of Jake "The Preacher" Cavaliere, lead vocalist and Farfisa organ, Dani Sin, guitar, Rob "The Garbageman" Zim, bass guitar, and Barry 'the Hatchet' van Esbroek on drums.

The story of the band has its proper start in late 1999.  Veterans of the SoCal music scene Jake Cavaliere and Johnny Devilla, late of the instro/surf juggernaut The Bomboras, were looking to form something new.  Max Eidson, Doran Shelley, and Gabriel Hammond rounded out the original lineup known as "The First Five".  Their first show was at The Garage in Hollywood.  Through personnel changes and various challenges over the last 17 years The Lords of Altamont have continued to release albums and play for fans around the world.  High points include touring as the support act for their primitive rock n roll idols The Cramps and counting  Michael Davis of the MC5 as a past member.

Reception 
SoundsXP stated: "There’s not a touch of subtlety or originality but for a rabble-rousing 35 minutes, or as the soundtrack to The Wild One, this can’t be beat." The band has been featured on numerous compilation CDs, notably with the lead track on MOJO's Hendrix tribute with a version of Can You See Me. They have toured extensively, including a performance as part of the 2006 SXSW festival.

Discography
Albums (available on CD & LP)
 To Hell With The Lords (2003) Sympathy for the Record Industry
 Lords Have Mercy (2005) Gearhead/Fargo
 The Altamont Sin (2008) Phantom Sound & Vision
 Midnight To 666  (2011) Fargo Records
 The Lords Take Altamont (2014) Gearhead/Fargo
 The Wild Sounds of The Lords of Altamont (2017) Heavy Psych Sounds Records
 Tune In Turn On Electrify (2021) Heavy Psych Sounds Records
Singles and EPs
 "The Split" b/w "She Cried" (2005) (Fargo Records), 7" Single
 "Getting High (On My Mystery Plane)" b/w "(Please) Get Back in the Car" & "Faded Black" (2009), 7" Single/EP
 "Burn Me Out" b/w "Black Eyed Girl" (2011), released on the band's personal "vinyl only" label "Hard Ride Records", 7" Single
 "Going Downtown" b/w "Evil ( Is Goin' On )" (2017), 7" Single/EP label "Hard Ride Records"

References

External links
 Lords Of Altamont Official Website
  Official Facebook
 Gearhead Records Lords Bio
 Lords Of Altamont at Myspace

Garage rock groups from California
Musical groups from Los Angeles
Psychedelic rock music groups from California